The Riverside School Board (RSB) is an English-language school board in the province of Quebec and provides educational services and programs to all students who have a certificate of eligibility for English education in Quebec. They are responsible for anglophone public schools on South Shore (Montreal). Riverside consistently places among the top five and has one of the lowest dropout rates of the 72 public school boards in Quebec, both English and French. It is the birthplace of the French immersion program and offers the International Baccalaureate program in many of their elementary and high Schools.

Their territory spans more than 7,500 square kilometres (2900 sq. mi.) and extends from Sorel in the north, along the St. Lawrence River to Sainte-Catherine in the west, south to the United States border and several kilometres east of the Richelieu River. Riverside's educational and training facilities serve the residents of over 115 municipalities on the Montérégie.

Lucie Roy is currently the Director General of the school board and the Chair of the Council of Commissioners is Dan Lamoureux.

List of RSB Schools
This school board oversees 19 elementary schools, 4 secondary schools, 2 special education schools, and 5 adult and vocational centres, in which over 10,000 students are enrolled.

Elementary school
 Boucherville Elementary School (Boucherville, Quebec)
 Cedar street (Beloeil, Quebec)
 Courtland Park International Elementary School (Saint-Bruno-de-Montarville, Quebec)
 Good Shepherd Elementary School (Brossard, Quebec)
 Greenfield Park Primary International School (Longueuil, Québec)
 Harold Napper Elementary School (Brossard, Quebec)
 Harold Sheppard Elementary School (Sorel-Tracy, Quebec)
 John Adam Elementary School (Delson, Quebec)
 Mount Bruno Elementary School (Saint-Bruno-de-Montarville, Quebec)
 Mountainview Elementary School (Otterburn Park, Quebec)
 Royal Charles Elementary School (Longueuil, Québec)
 St. John's School (Saint-Jean-sur-Richelieu, Quebec)
 St. Jude Elementary School (Longueuil, Quebec)
 St. Lambert Elementary School (Saint-Lambert, Quebec)
 St. Lawrence, building 002 (Champlain)(Candiac, Quebec)
 St. Lawrence, building 010 (St. Raymond) (Candiac, Quebec)
 St. Mary's Elementary School (Longueuil, Quebec)
 Terry Fox Elementary School (Longueuil, Quebec)
 William Latter Elementary School (Chambly, Quebec)

High schools
 Centennial Regional High School (Longueuil, Québec)
 Saint-Lambert International High School, formerly Chambly County (Saint-Lambert, Quebec)
 Heritage Regional High School (Longueuil, Québec)
 St. John's School (Saint-Jean-sur-Richelieu, Quebec)

Other Schools
 ACCESS Brossard - Language Centre (Brossard, Québec)
 ACCESS Cleghorn - Adult Education and Vocational Studies (Saint-Lambert, Québec)
 ACCESS Royal Oak - Vocational Studies (Saint-Hubert, Québec)
 ACCESS Darwin - Vocational Studies (Sainte-Julie, Québec)
 ACCESS Guimond - Vocational Studies (Longueuil, Québec)
 REACH (Saint-Lambert, Quebec)

See also
South Shore Protestant Regional School Board
New Frontiers School Board
Eastern Townships School Board

References

External links

Riverside School Board Portal

 
Education in Montérégie
Quebec English School Boards Association
School districts in Quebec
Organizations based in Longueuil